Zhouia is a genus of bacteria from the family of Flavobacteriaceae. Zhouia is named after Pei-Jin Zhou.

References

Flavobacteria
Bacteria genera
Taxa described in 2006